Evsei Borisovich Agron (25 January 1932 – 4 May 1985) was boss of New York City's Russian mafia during the 1970s and 1980s. Known for his cruelty, he was called the "Godfather" of the Russian American mafia.

Born in Leningrad, of Jewish origins, Agron immigrated to the United States in 1975. He swiftly gained control of criminal operations among the Soviet Jews living in Brighton Beach. Agron organized a motor fuel racket which would earn millions, if not billions, through fuel tax fraud. This type of fraud, which involved selling tax-free home heating oil as diesel fuel, eventually cost the state of New Jersey alone an estimated $1 billion annually in lost tax revenues. He ran many of his operations out of the El Caribe club, which was part-owned by Trump lawyer Michael Cohen. Other mobsters closed in on the fuel racket, and a rival organization began expanding its own criminal operations under Boris Goldberg, who, in 1989, would be charged under the Racketeer Influenced and Corrupt Organizations Act (RICO) for drug trafficking, armed robbery, extortion, arms dealing and attempted murder.

Agron died after being shot twice in the head outside his Brooklyn apartment in May 1985, at the age of 53. He was succeeded by Marat Balagula as leader of the Russian mob in the United States. In 2018, Heather Digby Parton wrote in Salon that "[Balagula] was suspected of killing Agron".

References

Further reading
Robert I. Friedman, Red Mafia: How the Russian Mob Infiltrated America.
Sifakis, Carl. The Mafia Encyclopedia. New York: Da Capo Press, 2005. 

1932 births
1985 deaths
Russian Jews
Russian gangsters
Murdered Jewish American gangsters
Soviet emigrants to the United States
People from Brighton Beach
American crime bosses
American people of Russian-Jewish descent
Thieves in law
Deaths by firearm in Brooklyn
20th-century American Jews